Field handball at the 1936 Summer Olympics was the first appearance of the sport at the Olympics. It was contested by six teams. Games were played outdoors with 11 players on each side.

The six teams were split into two groups of three. Each team played each other within each group.  The top two teams in each group advanced to the final round, while the third-ranked teams played each other for fifth and sixth places. In the final round, each team played each other. Final rankings were based on the records of each team in those three games.

Participating nations
Each country was allowed to enter a team of 22 players and they all were eligible for participation.

A total of 107(*) field handball players from 6 nations competed at the Berlin Games:

 
 
 
 
 
 

(*) NOTE: Only players that participated in at least one game are counted.

Not all reserve players are known.

Squads

Medallists

Results

Preliminary round

Group A

Group B

Classification 5/6

Final round

Summary

References

External links
Official Olympic Report

 
1936 Summer Olympics events